This is an alphabetical list of notable geysers, a type of erupting hot spring:

Beehive Geyser (Wyoming, United States)
Beowawe (Nevada, United States)
Bolshoi (Greater) Geyser (Kamchatka, Russia) - see Valley of Geysers
Castle Geyser (Wyoming, United States)
Daisy Geyser (Wyoming, United States)
Diamond Geyser (Orakei Korako, New Zealand)
El Tatio, Northern Chile
Excelsior Geyser (Wyoming, United States)
Fan & Mortar Geysers (Wyoming, United States)
Floriano de Lemos Geyser (Minas Gerais, Brazil)
Fly Geyser (Black Rock Desert, Nevada)
Geysir (Haukadalur, Iceland)
Giant Geyser (Wyoming, United States)
Giantess Geyser (Wyoming, United States)
Grand Geyser (Wyoming, United States)
Great Fountain Geyser (Wyoming, United States)
Ledge Geyser (Wyoming, United States)
Kereru Geyser (Whakarewarewa, New Zealand)
Lady Knox Geyser (Waiotapu, New Zealand)
Maly (Lesser) Geyser (Kamchatka, Russia) - see Valley of Geysers
Minguini Geyser (Orakei Korako, New Zealand)
Monarch Geyser (Wyoming, United States)
Morning Geyser (Wyoming, United States)
Old Faithful Geyser (Wyoming, United States)
Pohutu Geyser (Whakarewarewa, New Zealand)
Prince of Wales Feathers Geyser (Whakarewarewa, New Zealand)
Riverside Geyser (Wyoming, United States)
Sakharny (Sugar) Geyser (Kamchatka, Russia) - see Valley of Geysers
 Sapareva Geyser (Sapareva Banya, Bulgaria)
 Sijarinska Geyser (Sijarinska Banja), Serbia)
Splendid Geyser (Wyoming, United States)
Steamboat Geyser (Wyoming, United States)
Steamboat Springs, (Nevada, United States)
Strokkur (Haukadalur, Iceland)
Velikan (Giant) Geyser (Kamchatka, Russia) - see Valley of Geysers
Waimangu Geyser (Rotorua, New Zealand)
Zhemchuzhny (Pearl) Geyser (Kamchatka, Russia) - see Valley of Geysers
Chabahar Geyser (Iran )

Cold water 
The following are carbon dioxide-generated cold water geysers:

Andernach Geyser (aka Namedyer Sprudel), (Eifel, Germany)
Crystal Geyser (near Green River, Utah, United States)
Geyser of Herľany (Herľany, Slovakia)
 Saratoga springs
 Mokena Geyser (Te Aroha, New Zealand)
Soda Springs Geyser, (Idaho, United States)
Wallender Born (aka Brubbel), (Eifel, Germany)

See also 
Geothermal areas of Yellowstone

Geysers